"Not Over Yet" is a song by British YouTuber and rapper KSI featuring British singer-songwriter Tom Grennan. The song was written by the two artists alongside Sara Boe, Richard Boardman, and producers Digital Farm Animals & Billen Ted. "Not Over Yet" was released for digital download and streaming by Warner Music Group, Beerus Limited, and Atlantic Records on 5 August 2022. A remix of the song was released 27 August 2022 featuring British rappers Headie One and Nines. The remix was performed for KSI’s ring walk against Luis Alcaraz Pineda on 27 August 2022.

"Not Over Yet" debuted at number four on the UK Singles Chart, becoming KSI's eighth top 10 hit, and Grennan's fourth.

Music and lyrics 
"Not Over Yet" featuring an "energetic" drum and bass beat with "tender" lyrics conveying "the singer's struggle to overcome feelings of self-doubt".

Track listing

Credits and personnel 
Credits adapted from YouTube Music
 Tom Grennan – vocals, composer
 Billen Ted – producer
 Digital Farm Animals – producer, backing vocals, composer
 KSI – vocals, composer
 Paul Hesketh – guitar
 Sara Boe – backing vocals, composer
 Richard Boardman – composer
 Sam Brennan – composer
 Tom Hollings – composer

Charts

Certifications

Release history

References 

2022 singles
2022 songs
KSI songs
Tom Grennan songs
Songs written by KSI
Songs written by Tom Grennan
Songs written by Digital Farm Animals
Songs written by Richard Boardman
Song recordings produced by Digital Farm Animals
Headie One songs